Paza (Phusang, Phosang, Phousang, Basar, Bazar, (Pusa?);) is a Loloish language of northern Laos. Paza speakers consist of 2,100 people distributed in 8 villages of Ban Phusang Mai, Muang Samphan, Phongsaly, and 1 village in Oudomxay. It is documented as "Phusang" in Kato (2008), which has a brief word list of the language collected from Phusangkao village, Samphan District.

References

Sources
Kato, Takashi. 2008. Linguistic Survey of Tibeto-Burman languages in Lao P.D.R. Tokyo: Institute for the Study of Languages and Cultures of Asia and Africa (ILCAA).

Further reading 
Schliesinger, Joachim. 2003. Ethnic Groups of Laos. vol. 4. Sino-Tibetan-Speaking Peoples. White Lotus Press. Bangkok. (see pages 134-19).

Southern Loloish languages
Languages of Laos